Benjamin Safdie (born February 24, 1986) is an American film director, screenwriter, actor and film editor best known for working with his older brother Josh as a filmmaker, whose works include Good Time (2017) and Uncut Gems (2019).

Early life
Safdie was born to Amy and Alberto Safdie, he is Jewish and was raised in New York. He and brother Josh would divide their childhood living between their father in Queens and their mother and stepfather in Manhattan upon their parents divorce. He attended Columbia Grammar & Preparatory School, and graduated from the Boston University College of Communication in 2008.

Career

Filmmaker

The Safdies' first feature was the 2009 film Daddy Longlegs, which they also wrote the screenplay and edited together. The film was showcased in the Directors' Fortnight at the 2009 Cannes Film Festival. In 2013, they debuted the documentary film Lenny Cooke at the Tribeca Film Festival, a documentary they became attached to after Cooke approached them to review the footage. In 2014, the pair premiered their next film Heaven Knows What at the 71st Venice International Film Festival. It premiered at the 2017 Cannes Film Festival, where it competed for the Palme d'Or.

In February 2016, the brothers began filming their crime thriller film Good Time. which Benny starred in alongside Robert Pattinson, in New York City. Benny, for his performance, was nominated for the Independent Spirit Award for Best Supporting Male.

Uncut Gems, Josh and Benny's next film, starred Adam Sandler, Lakeith Stanfield and Julia Fox and was executive produced by Martin Scorsese. The brothers won the Independent Spirit Award for Best Director, and Benny shared the Independent Spirit Award for Best Editing with Ronald Bronstein, with whom he co-edited with on all the Safdie brother films.

In December 2020, Showtime gave a series order to a half hour series titled The Curse, which Safdie created alongside Nathan Fielder. They will star alongside Emma Stone in the series, with Josh serving as an executive producer.

Acting roles
In 2017, Safdie began taking on performances not directed by himself or Josh, appearing in a role in the film Person to Person. In 2020, he would appear in Pieces of a Woman,<ref>{{cite web |last1=D'Alessandro |first1=Anthony |title=Sarah Snook & Benny Safdie Join 'Pieces Of A Woman; Jaime Zevallos & Adrienne Lovette Board A Boy Like That |url=https://deadline.com/2020/01/sarah-snook-benny-safdie-pieces-of-a-woman-jaime-zevallos-adrienne-lovette-a-boy-like-that-cast-1202837557/ |website=Deadline Hollywood |access-date=January 14, 2022 |date=January 21, 2020}}</ref> and in 2021 would star in the Paul Thomas Anderson film Licorice Pizza.

In 2022, Safdie appeared in Claire Denis' romantic thriller Stars at Noon, and as Nari in the Disney+ miniseries Obi-Wan Kenobi. He will star in the film adaptation Are You There God? It's Me, Margaret, and as Edward Teller in Oppenheimer'', directed by Christopher Nolan, which will both premiere in 2023.

Personal life
Safdie is Jewish, his father a Sephardic Jew of Syrian-Jewish descent, and mother an Ashkenazi Jew of Russian-Jewish descent. His uncle is architect Moshe Safdie and is cousins with playwright Oren Safdie.

He is married to Ava Safdie, with whom he has two sons.

Filmography

As filmmaker

As actor
Film

Television

Awards and nominations

References

External links
 
 Red Bucket Films

1986 births
American film directors
American screenwriters
American actors
American film editors
21st-century American Jews
American people of Russian-Jewish descent
American people of Syrian-Jewish descent
American Ashkenazi Jews
American Sephardic Jews
American Mizrahi Jews
Boston University College of Communication alumni
Independent Spirit Award for Best Director winners
Living people
People from Manhattan
People from Queens, New York